Montferrer i Castellbò is a municipality in the comarca of Alt Urgell, Lleida, Catalonia, Spain.

Montferrer i Castellbò towns:

Aravell
Bellestar
El Balcó del Pirineu
Montferrer de Segre
Sant Joan de l'Erm
Vilamitjana del Cantó
Vila-rubla

The municipality includes a small exclave to the south.

Andorra–La Seu d'Urgell Airport is located in Montferrer i Castellbò.

Landmarks
Santa Cecília de Elins

References

External links
 Government data pages 

Municipalities in Alt Urgell